Lorenzo Fortunato (born 9 May 1996) is an Italian cyclist, who currently rides for UCI ProTeam .

Fortunato had his first professional win at the 2021 Giro d'Italia, which was also his first Grand Tour, when he soloed to win stage 14 atop the Monte Zoncolan after dropping Jan Tratnik 2.3 kilometers from the finish. He ended up finishing 26 seconds ahead of Tratnik, and 59 seconds ahead of third place Alessandro Covi.

Major results

2013
 1st Trofeo Guido Dorigo
 2nd Gran Premio Sportivi di Sovilla
 5th Road race, European Junior Road Championships
 8th Overall Giro di Basilicata
2014
 3rd Overall GP Général Patton
1st   Points classification
 8th Road race, UCI Junior Road World Championships
2017
 10th Trofeo Piva
2018
 6th Overall Giro della Valle d'Aosta
 6th Gran Premio Sportivi di Poggiana
 8th Coppa della Pace
 9th GP Capodarco
2019
 4th Overall Tour of Albania
 6th Overall Tour of Almaty
2020
 8th Overall Tour de Langkawi
2021
 1st  Overall Adriatica Ionica Race
1st  Mountains classification
1st Stage 2
 1st Stage 14 Giro d'Italia
 8th Overall Giro di Sicilia
2022
 2nd Overall Vuelta a Asturias
 6th Giro dell'Emilia

Grand Tour general classification results timeline

References

External links

1996 births
Living people
Italian male cyclists
Cyclists from Bologna
Italian Giro d'Italia stage winners